Simon Chang may refer to:

 Simon Chang (designer), Chinese-Canadian women's fashion designer
 Simon Chang (politician) (born 1954), Premier of the Republic of China